Andy Husbands (born February 12, 1969) is a chef, restaurateur, author and television personality. Currently, he is the chef and owner of The Smoke Shop BBQ restaurants, Boston magazine's "Best Barbecue Restaurant of 2018" and The Improper Bostonian "Best Barbecue" of 2017 and 2018. Smoke Shop BBQ has locations in various Boston metropolitan locations, including Cambridge's Kendall Square and Seaport's Fort Point and Somerville's Assembly Row. He has nearly 30 years in the restaurant industry.

Biography
Born and raised in Seattle, Husbands moved to Massachusetts with his father in 1984 at the age of fourteen. That was also the year he took an after-school job working at a neighborhood bakery. In 1992, after graduating from Johnson & Wales University, he became sous-chef at the nationally renowned East Coast Grill under mentor Chris Schlesinger.

In 1995 he took a cross-country trip on his motorcycle, lived on a New Mexico farm during his journey, and then worked in several San Francisco-based restaurants. These experiences greatly influenced the seasonally-focused menu at his beloved Tremont 647, Husbands' first restaurant, which opened in 1996. Over time Tremont 647 became a South End staple: everyone in Boston knew this restaurant at the corner of Tremont and West Brookline streets and their "Pajama Brunch" and "Taco Tuesdays" to their seasonally-influenced dinner menu.

Hailed as "Boston's Meat Maven" by The Boston Globe, Husbands first came into the national spotlight competing on Season 6 of FOX Television Network's fiery Hell's Kitchen, finishing in 8th place, and has since appeared on CBS This Morning, Food Network and Fox & Friends. He is the co-founder of the internationally recognized BBQ team IQUE BBQ, which became the first New England team to win the World Champions of BBQ title in 2009 at the Jack Daniels World Championship in Tennessee. He has co-authored five coveted cookbooks, including Wicked Good Burgers, Wicked Good BBQ, Grill to Perfection, The Fearless Chef, and his latest, Pitmaster: Recipes, Techniques & Barbecue Wisdom, which was recently awarded "Book of the Year" by National Barbeque News.

Charity
Husbands is concerned about childhood hunger and donates his time and money to Share Our Strength, the national hunger relief organization. For 20 years he has also hosted the organization's direct-service annual program, Operation Frontline (now called Cooking Matters), which is a dinner at Tremont 647. He is honorary chair of Share Our Strength's Boston Taste of the Nation annual fundraiser and is on the restaurant committee for the Rodman Ride for Kids, an annual event that raises money for children's charities. He is also an active board member of the Massachusetts Restaurant Association, for which he was honored as MRA's Chef of the Year in 2014, as well as a Rodman Celebration Restaurant Chair.

In September 2017 Husbands joined forces with restaurants East Coast Grill, Firefly's BBQ, BT's Smokehouse and Blue Ribbon BBQ to host Operation BBQ Relief, a fundraiser benefitting those affected by Hurricane Harvey and Hurricane Irma. Husbands and his team raised over $11,000 for the charity.

IQue Barbecue
When not in the kitchen and working with his favorite charities, Husbands competes with his internationally recognized BBQ team, IQUE BBQ. In 2007 IQue took 1st place, out of 510 teams, in the brisket category at the Kansas City Royal. IQUE became the first New England team to become World Champions of BBQ at the Jack Daniels World Championships in Lynchburg, Tennessee in 2010.

Cookbooks
Husbands' first cookbook, The Fearless Chef: Innovative Recipes from the Edge of American Cuisine, was released in 2004. Husbands collaborated with iQue BBQ teammate, Chris Hart, for his second cookbook, Wicked Good Barbecue, released in March 2012. In April 2014, Husbands' Grill to Perfection was released through Page Street Publishing. After The Fearless Chef, Husbands released his latest cookbook, Pitmaster: Recipes, Techniques & Barbecue Wisdom, which was recently awarded "Book of the Year" by National Barbeque News.

Awards
In 2000 and 2002, he was named one of Boston's nightlife's most influential people by Stuff at Night magazine. In the spring of 2005, he was one of only five "Celebrated Chefs" chosen by the National Pork Board. He participated in the Board's national media tour for its "Pork, the Other White Meat" campaign.

A particular passion for Husbands is participating in barbecue competitions, which he has done from Vermont to Tennessee, capturing numerous trophies with his team. Most notably in 2007, Husbands' team IQUE BBQ, with sponsorship from Harpoon Brewery, took 1st place out of 510 teams in the Brisket category at the Kansas City Royal.

Husbands was a semi-finalist in the James Beard Award's Best Chef category in 2008 and 2009. Other honors include: Wine Spectator Award of Excellence, grand prize in the National Poultry Council's Grab Bag Contest, and several "Best of Boston" awards from Boston magazine and other Boston-area periodicals.

References

External links

The Smoke Shop
 iQUE BBQ

American restaurateurs
American male chefs
Participants in American reality television series
Writers from Boston
Living people
1969 births
Reality cooking competition contestants
Johnson & Wales University alumni
Chefs from Massachusetts
Barbecue chefs
Chefs from Seattle